"Old Joe Clark" is a US folk song, a mountain ballad that was popular among soldiers from eastern Kentucky during World War I and afterwards. Its lyrics refer to a real person named Joseph Clark, a Kentucky mountaineer who was born in 1839 and murdered in 1885. The "playful and sometimes outlandish verses" have led to the conjecture that it first spread as a children's song and via play parties. There are about 90 stanzas in various versions of the song. The tune is based on an A major scale in the Mixolydian mode, but moreover has definite hints of a complete blues scale, namely, the flatted 3rd and 5th.

Although "Old Joe Clark" may have originated in the 19th century, no printed records are known from before 1900. An early version was printed in 1918, as sung in Virginia at that time.

"Old Joe Clark" has been described as "one of the most widely known of all Southern fiddle tunes [as of the late 20th century. ... It] has, to a degree, become part of the [United States] national repertory. One may hear it in bluegrass jam sessions, old-time fiddle sessions, and country dances throughout the United States."

Score

Lyrics
Fare-the-well Old Joe Clark, goodbye Mitsy Brow-owww-owwwn
Fare-the-well Old Joe Clark, I'm gonna leave this town
Old Joe Clark he had a house 16 stories high
and every story in that house was filled with chicken pie
I went down to Old Joe's house – never been there before
He slept on a feather bed, and I slept on the floor.

Refrain:
Round and around old Joe Clark Round and around I say
Round and around Old Joe Clark. I hav'n't long to stay.

Recordings
The song has been recorded by many artists, including:
1924: Cowan Powers and his Family Band – third best selling album that year
1940s: Woody Guthrie
1962: Kingston Trio
1968: Don Partridge on his inaugural solo album
1985: Uncle Charlie Osborne

Modern adaptations
 The riff of Ian Dury's 1977 single "Sex & Drugs & Rock & Roll" originates from "Old Joe Clark".
 The melody was adapted by Mojo Nixon, Jello Biafra, and the Toadliquors for "Let's Go Burn Old Nashville Down" for their 1994 album Prairie Home Invasion, a song that has been described as a comment "on the sad state of country music in the '90s".  
 On jazz guitarist Pat Metheny's 80/81 album, bassist Charlie Haden quotes from the melody of "Old Joe Clark" during his solo on "Two Folk Songs 1st | 2nd." Haden had also quoted from the song in his earlier solo in Ornette Coleman's "Ramblin'" (from 1960's Change of the Century), and the same unmistakable riff shows up as well in Haden's solo bass performance "Taney County" (on Haden's 1987 Quartet West album).  Haden's preoccupation with the song is evident, too, on Rambling Boy (a reference to the 1960 Coleman song...?), the 2008 album credited to "Charlie Haden Family & Friends"; on this collection of collaborative interpretations of standards, Jack Black takes the lead singing "Old Joe Clark."  
 The melody is used as part of the score (composed by Carter Burwell) for the 2019 stop-motion animated feature film Missing Link, during a bar brawl sequence. This rendition was performed by the bluegrass band The Grascals.

References

External links
"Old Joe Clark" lyrics, biography, song history, notable recordings, videos and tab links
"Old Joe Clark", traditionalmusic.co.uk
Text, BluegrassNet Bluegrass Lyrics
"Old Joe Clark", Digital Tradition Mirror
"Old Joe Clark", Folk Den

1925 singles
American folk songs